Diné College Press (formerly Navajo Community College Press) is the publishing division of Diné College, headquartered in Tsaile, Arizona, but whose territory spans throughout the Navajo Nation. Diné College Press has published books by and pertaining to Native Americans. While most titles focus on the issues of the Navajo people, others have dealt with broader issues pertaining to Native American studies. Authors include Acoma Pueblo poet and author Simon J. Ortiz and Pawnee-Otoe-Missouria author Anna Lee Walters.

Published works
Titles published by the Diné College Press include the following.

Ruth Roessel. Illustrated by Raymond Johnson and Jason Chee. Navajo studies at Navajo Community College. (1971). .
Ethelou Yazzie, ed. Andy Tsihnahjinnie, illustrator. Martin Hoffman, photography. Navajo history. (1971). 
Ruth Roessel, ed. Navajo stories of the long walk period. (1973). .
Ruth Roessel and Broderick H. Johnson. Navajo Livestock Reduction: a national disgrace. (1974). .
Ruth Roessel. The role of Indian studies in American education. (1974). .
Robert A. Roessel. elect Navajo historical occurrences, 1850-1923. (1974). .
Hildegard Thompson. The Navajos' long walk for education: a history of Navajo education = Diné Nizaagóó liná bíhoo'aah yíkánaaskai: Diné óhoot' aahii baa hane'''. (1975).
 Prepared by participants in an Institute on American Indian Culture, conducted at Navajo Community College: Summer 1970. Our friends, the Navajos: a select collection of studies. (1976). .
Authored by 22 Navajo men and women; Broderick H. Johnson, ed.; illustrators, Raymond Johnson and Hoke Denetsosie. Stories of traditional Navajo life and culture = Alk\id ̨á ̨á\ y ̨é ̨ék\ehgo Diné Kéédahat\in ̨é ̨é Baa Nahane. (1977). .
Peggy V. Beck. The Cheyenne. (1977). .
Peggy V. Beck, Anna Lee Walters, Nia Francisco The sacred: ways of knowledge, sources of life. (1977). .
Keats Begay. Navajos and World War II. (1977). .
Linda Goodman. Music and dance in Northwest Coast Indian life. (1977). 
J. Richard Haefer. Papago music and dance. (1977). .
Simon Ortiz. Song, poetry and language-expression and perception. (1977). .
Robert Rhodes. Hopi music and dance. (1977). .
Robert W. Young. A political history of the Navajo tribe. (1978). .
Simon J. Ortiz, ed. Earth power coming: short fiction in native American literature. (1983). . .
Frank D. Reeve; edited by Eleanor Adams and John Kessell. Navaho foreign affairs, 1795-1846. (1983). .
K. D. Williamson, Jr. Navajo energy resources. (1983). .
Donald Levering; photographs by Gregg D. Baker and Leonard Gorman. Outcroppings from Navajoland: poems. (1984). 
James A. Mischke. Circles, consciousness and culture. (1984). .
Floyd Allen Pollock. A Navajo confrontation and crisis.
David M. Brugge. Navajos in the Catholic Church records of New Mexico, 1694-1875. (1985). .
Sam Bingham, Janet Bingham; illustrated by Hank Willie. Navajo Chapters. (1987). .
J. Loring Haskell. Southern Athapaskan migration, A. D. 200-1750. (1987). .
David E. Wilkins. Diné bibeehaz'áanii: a handbook of Navajo government. (1987). .
Recorded by Mary C. Wheelwright; edited with commentaries by David P. McAllester; foreword by Rain Parrish; with 22 color plates after sandpaintings recorded by Franc J. Newcomb and others; illustrated by Jason Chee. The myth and prayers of the Great Star chant and the myth of the Coyote chant. (1988).  .  .
Martha Blue. The Witch purge of 1878: Oral and documentary history in the early Navajo reservation years. (1988). 
Klara B. Kelley and Peter M. Whiteley. Navajoland: family settlement and land use. (1989). 
Vernon O. Mayes and Barbara Bayless Lacy; with illustrations by Jack Ahasteen and Jason Chee. Naniseʹ: a Navajo herbal: one hundred plants from the Navajo Reservation. (1989). .
Norman T. Oppelt. The tribally controlled Indian colleges: the beginnings of self determination in American Indian education. (1990). .
Diné Center for Human Development. The Navajo dictionary on diagnostic terminology: a reference guide on Navajo usage of diagnostic terms. (1991). .
Marilyne Virginia Mabery. Right after sundown: teaching stories of the Navajos. (1991). .
Troxey Kemper. Comanche warbonnet: a story of Quanah Parker. (1991). .
Jimmy H. Miller. The life of Harold Sellers Colton: a Philadelphia Brahmin in Flagstaff. (1991). .
Della Frank and Roberta D. Joe; illustrator David Chethlahe Paladin. Storm pattern: poems from two Navajo women. (1993). .
Marie Lewis; David Nez. Tsʹ̕iliiyʹazhʹi Spuds baa hane ̕. (The story of a dog named Spuds.) (1993). .
Howard Meredith. Modern American Indian tribal government and politics. (1993). .
Ralph Salisbury. One Indian and two chiefs: short fiction. (1993). .
Roman de los Santos; illustrated by Raymond J. Johnson. The English-Navajo children's picture dictionary: selected words and phrases. (1995). .

Notes

References
 Roessel, Ruth. Navajo studies at Navajo Community College. Tsaile, AZ: Navajo Community College Press: 1971. .
 Roessel, Ruth.  Papers on Navajo Culture and Life.'' Navajo Community College Press, 1970.

External links
 Official webpage

Education on the Navajo Nation
Book publishing companies of the United States
Native American studies
Apache County, Arizona